Doom at Your Service is a 2021 South Korean television series starring Park Bo-young and Seo In-guk. It aired on tvN from May 10 to June 29, 2021.

Synopsis
Tak Dong-kyung (Park Bo-young), an editor for a web novel company, lives a fairly ordinary life until she stumbles into an unexpected fate. All in a single day, she finds out she is dying from glioblastoma and has only three months to live, learns that her boyfriend is a father-to-be and has a wife, gets scolded by her superior at work, and is spied on by a pervert before the pervert falls into a sinkhole.

Drinking her problems away, she happens to see a shooting star from her rooftop apartment and drunkenly wishes for the world to be doomed. Her wish is heard by Myul Mang (Seo In-guk), a messenger between gods and humans. He was born between dark and light: when he breathes, countries disappear; when he walks, the seasons collapse; when he smiles, a life is extinguished. All he has to do is exist for something to fall into ruin. This is not his intention but simply his fate. On his birthday, he gets to choose a human's wish to fulfill. Sick of his fate, he chooses to fulfill Dong-kyung's wish to end the world.

Dong-kyung ends up signing a hundred-day contract with Myul Mang, risking everything she has ever known.

Cast

Main
 Park Bo-young as Tak Dong-kyung, a web novel editor for six years at a publishing company called Life Story. She has been working hard ever since her parents died due to an accident.
 Seo In-guk as Myul Mang / Kim Sa-ram, a messenger between gods and humans who only follows fate without any intention nor passion. Growing tired of his immortal life of bringing misfortune and destruction, he decides to end the world and thus bring doom upon himself.
 Lee Soo-hyuk as Cha Joo-ik, Dong-kyung's co-worker who is the editorial team leader.
 Kang Tae-oh as Lee Hyun-kyu, Joo-ik's roommate who is a café owner.
 Shin Do-hyun as Na Ji-na / Lee Hyun (pen name), Dong-kyung's best friend who is a web novelist.

Supporting

Dong-kyung's family
 Dawon as Tak Sun-kyung, Dong-kyung's younger brother.
 Woo Hee-jin as Kang Soo-ja, Dong-kyung and Sun-kyung's aunt.

People at Life Story
 Song Jin-woo as Park Chang-shin, the CEO of Life Story.
 Song Joo-hee as Jo Ye-ji, Dong-kyung's friend who is an editor at Life Story.
 Choi So-yoon as Kim Da-in / Shanghai Park (pen name), Dong-kyung's colleague.
 Park Tae-in as Park Jung-min, a new employee of Life Story's editorial team.
 Lee Seung-joon as Jung Seung-joon / Jung Dang-myeon (pen name), a neurosurgeon and also a web novelist.
 Heo Jae-ho as Jijo King (pen name), a web novelist.
 Nam Da-reum as Park Young / Gwi Gong-ja "Young Prince" (pen name), Life Story's star writer who is actually a high school student.
 Oh Yeon-ah as Dalgona (pen name), a web novelist.
 Son Woo-hyun as Siberia (pen name), a web novelist.

Other
 Jung Ji-so as a goddess

Special appearances
 Kim Ji-seok as Jo Dae-han, Dong-kyung's ex-boyfriend. ( 2–3)
 Han Ye-ri as a patient (Ep. 3, 6)
 Kwon Soo-hyun as Dong-kyung's blind date (Ep. 6)
 Daniel C. Kennedy as Kevin, Soo-ja's husband.

Original soundtrack

Part 1

Part 2

Part 3

Part 4

Part 5

Part 6

Part 7

Viewership

International broadcast
The series was pre-sold to 150 countries. It is available for streaming on various platforms such as Viki, Viu,  in Japan, iQIYI in Taiwan, and Now TV in Hong Kong. It also aired on Mnet Japan from October 23, 2021.

Listicle

Note

References

External links

  
 Doom at Your Service at Studio&NEW 
 Doom at Your Service at Studio Dragon 
 
 

TVN (South Korean TV channel) television dramas
Korean-language television shows
2021 South Korean television series debuts
2021 South Korean television series endings
Television series by Studio Dragon
Television series by Next Entertainment World
South Korean fantasy television series
South Korean romance television series
Korean-language Viu (streaming media) exclusive international distribution programming